Pignatiello is a surname. Notable people with the surname include:

Carlo Pignatiello (born 2000), Scottish footballer
Carmen Pignatiello (born 1982), American baseball player
Tony Pignatiello (born 1969), Canadian soccer player
Delfina Pignatiello (born 2000), Argentine swimmer